Montanissell is a locality located in the municipality of Coll de Nargó, in Province of Lleida province, Catalonia, Spain. As of 2020, it has a population of 19.

Geography 
Montanissell is located 125km northeast of Lleida.

References

Populated places in the Province of Lleida